Brooklynn Marie Proulx (born April 27, 1999) is a former Canadian actress.

She was born on April 27, 1999, in Cranbrook, British Columbia, and resides in Calgary, Alberta. Her first role was playing Paris Jackson in a film about popstar Michael Jackson.

In 2005 she played Jenny at age 4 in Brokeback Mountain. In 2007 she played Mary James in the historical western film The Assassination of Jesse James by the Coward Robert Ford. In 2009 she played young Clare in The Time Traveler's Wife. In 2010 she played Sammy Jessup in 6 Souls starring Julianne Moore as her mother Cara Harding-Jessup, and Laura Forester in Piranha 3D.

In 2009 she was nominated in the 36th edition of the Saturn Award for Best Performance by a Younger Actor for her role in The Time Traveler's Wife.

Filmography

References

External links
 
 

1999 births
Living people
Actresses from British Columbia
Canadian child actresses
Canadian film actresses
People from Cranbrook, British Columbia
21st-century Canadian actresses